"I Got a Feelin'" is a song co-written and recorded by American country music singer Billy Currington. It was released in January 2004 as the second and final single from his 2003 self-titled debut album. The song peaked at number 5 on the U.S. Billboard Hot Country Songs chart in mid-2004. It also reached number 50 on the Billboard Hot 100. Currington wrote this song with Casey Beathard and Carson Chamberlain.

Critical reception
In his review of the album, Jeffrey B. Remz of Country Standard Time viewed the song favorably, saying that it showed Currington's traditional country sound by the prominence of fiddle (played by Stuart Duncan).

Music videos
The music video for the track was directed by Philip Andelman, filmed in the Mojave Desert in California, and co-stars Gena Lee Nolin.

Chart performance
"I Got a Feelin'" debuted at number 53 on the U.S. Billboard Hot Country Singles & Tracks chart for the week of January 17, 2004.

Charts

Weekly charts

Year-end charts

References

External links
Lyrics at CMT.com

2004 singles
Billy Currington songs
Songs written by Casey Beathard
Songs written by Carson Chamberlain
Song recordings produced by Carson Chamberlain
Mercury Nashville singles
Songs written by Billy Currington
2003 songs